David Henry Benedictus (born 16 September 1938) is an English writer and theatre director, best known for his novels. His work includes the Winnie-the-Pooh novel Return to the Hundred Acre Wood (2009). It was the first such book in 81 years.

Life
Born in 1938 to chartered accountant Henry Jules Benedictus and Kathleen Constance (née Ricardo). He  was educated at Eton College, Balliol College, Oxford, and the University of Iowa. His first novel The Fourth of June was a best-seller and he adapted it for the London stage. His second novel, You're a Big Boy Now, was made into a 1966 feature film directed by Francis Ford Coppola. He was an assistant to Trevor Nunn at the Royal Shakespeare Company. He has also worked as a commissioning editor for Drama at  Channel 4, and ran the Book at Bedtime series for BBC Radio 4.

He previously wrote and produced audio readings of the Pooh stories, with Judi Dench as Kanga and Geoffrey Palmer as Eeyore. He sent the trustees of the A. A. Milne estate two sample stories of his sequel, and it took more than eight years for them to approve the project.

At the time of the book's publication he admitted to nerves over its reception, saying, What's the worst thing that can happen, that I'll be torn apart by wild journalists? Happened before and I survived. At worst everyone will hate me and I'll just crawl under a bush and hide – I can live with that. Some people do hate the whole idea of a sequel, but it's not as if I'm doing any damage to the original, that will still be there. My hope is that people will finish reading a cracking story and just want more of them, and that's where I come in. Michael Brown, chairman of the Pooh Properties Trust, said Benedictus had a "wonderful feel" for the world of Pooh. However, Publishers Weekly was cool on the book, describing it as  "largely forgettable" and as missing "the charm of the first book".

Benedictus commented on his work in 1985, "Given peace of mind, financial independence, and a modicum of luck, I may produce a novel to be proud of one day." In March, 2014, he moved to Hove, a resort on the south coast of England, to be close to his extending family. He has four children, Jolyon Maugham KC, a barrister, Leo a journalist and novelist (The Afterparty, his first novel, was published by Jonathan Cape), Chloe a psychodynamic psychotherapist, and Jessica, a theatre producer.

He published an autobiography, Dropping Names, in 2005. According to an interview Benedictus gave to the Israeli newspaper Yediot Aharonot in 2009, he said that a cousin had done research into his surname and found out that it was actually "Baruch" (ברוך - having the same meaning as "Benedictus" in Hebrew), as well as research into how his ancestors emigrated to Britain, which revealed that they have Ashkenazi Jewish heritage.

Bibliography

The Fourth of June (1962)
You're a Big Boy Now (1963)
This Animal is Mischievous (1965)
Hump; or Bone By Bone Alive (1967)
The Guru and the Golf Club (1969)
World of Windows (1971)
Junk!: How and Where to Buy Beautiful Things for Next to Nothing (1976)
The Rabbi's Wife (1977)
A Twentieth Century Man (1978)
Lloyd George: A Novel (1981, from the screenplay of a BBC miniseries by Elaine Morgan)
The Antique Collector's Guide (1981)
Whose Life is it Anyway? (1982, from the play by Brian Clark)
Local Hero (1983, from the screenplay by Bill Forsyth)
Essential Guide to London (1984)
Floating Down to Camelot (1985)
Little Sir Nicholas (1990, with C. A. Jones)
Odyssey of a Scientist (1991, with Hans Kalmus)
Sunny Intervals and Showers: A Very British Passion (1992)
The Stamp Collector (1994)
What to Do When the Money Runs Out (2001, with Rupert Belsey)
Dropping Names (2005)
Return to the Hundred Acre Wood (2009)

References

External links

Official website

1938 births
Living people
People educated at Eton College
Alumni of Balliol College, Oxford
University of Iowa alumni
English Jews
English children's writers
20th-century English novelists
21st-century English novelists
English theatre directors
English male novelists
20th-century English male writers
21st-century English male writers